Nolan Yonkman (born April 1, 1981) is a Canadian former professional ice hockey defenceman who played in the National Hockey League (NHL) before concluding his career with JYP of the Finnish Liiga.

Career
Yonkman played major junior in the Western Hockey League (WHL) with the Kelowna Rockets and Brandon Wheat Kings. He was drafted 37th overall by the Washington Capitals in the 1999 NHL Entry Draft and made his National Hockey League (NHL) debut in 2001–02. Yonkman played the majority of his time with the Capitals' organization with their American Hockey League (AHL) affiliate, the Portland Pirates.

On July 17, 2006, Yonkman signed as a free agent with the Nashville Predators and played for their AHL affiliate, the Milwaukee Admirals, for three seasons. On July 13, 2009, he was re-signed by the Predators to a one-year contract.

After four seasons with the Admirals, Yonkman then signed a one-year contract with the Phoenix Coyotes on July 3, 2010. Yonkman played for their affiliate, the San Antonio Rampage. Yonkman remained as captain with the Rampage when their affiliation was changed from the Coyotes to the Florida Panthers by signing a two-year deal with the Panthers' organization on July 1, 2011. Over the course of his contract, he appeared in eight games for Florida as a reserve defenseman.

On July 7, 2013, Yonkman signed a one-year, two-way contract as a free agent with the Anaheim Ducks.

As a free agent following his season with the Ducks, Yonkman was unable to earn an NHL contract but was invited to the Calgary Flames training camp on September 18, 2014. Following his release from Calgary, Yonkman signed a one-year AHL contract with Flames' affiliate, the Adirondack Flames, on October 7, 2014.

On May 18, 2015, Yonkman headed overseas, signing a one-year contract with Finnish Liiga club JYP.

Following the 2018–19 season, his fourth season with JYP in the Liiga, Yonkman ended his 18-year professional career. He returned to North America, taking a job with junior club Milwaukee Power of the North American 3 Hockey League (NA3HL) as a player development consultant, and providing color commentary for My 24 television broadcasts of Admirals games. In 2021, he was hired by the Minnesota Wild to be an assistant coach with their AHL affiliate, the Iowa Wild.

Career statistics

References

External links

1981 births
Living people
Adirondack Flames players
Anaheim Ducks players
Brandon Wheat Kings players
Canadian ice hockey defencemen
Florida Panthers players
Hershey Bears players
Ice hockey people from Saskatchewan
JYP Jyväskylä players
Kelowna Rockets players
Milwaukee Admirals players
Norfolk Admirals players
Phoenix Coyotes players
Portland Pirates players
San Antonio Rampage players
Washington Capitals draft picks
Washington Capitals players
Canadian expatriate ice hockey players in Finland